Credant Technologies was a company formerly located in Addison, Texas that offered products and services for data security. The company was founded in 2001 by Bob Heard, Chris Burchett and Andrew Kahl. The company claims that their products protect two million end-points in several industries, such as universities, health-care, aeronautical, financial and government/defense.

Products
The company offers a range of products to protect data from "leaking". Several different versions of the main technology can be used on different locations in the network: via a "policy proxy" on the border between the LAN and the internet or in the DMZ, or a central "enterprise server" within the network. Also editions for Exchange servers and domain controllers are available.
Other products are self-encrypting drivers that will encrypt all data on that drive without any additional requirements on the client or from the user, BitLocker management systems, Policy Reporting tools.

Acquisition by Dell
On 18 December 2012, Dell announced that it has reached agreement with Credant that it would acquire the company. Prior to the acquisition Dell was already a technology partner of Credant.

Dell has bought 16 companies over the past 4 years, several of them directly or indirectly in the field of data-security. A major step in the field of security services was made by Dell at the start of 2011 when they acquired SecureWorks and in 2012 with the acquisition of SonicWall, best known for their firewalls and Intrusion Detection and Prevention appliances. But also other companies Dell bought over the past years offer products and services for security, including Perot Systems and Quest Software. With the acquisition of Credant Dell gambles on a continuation of the strong growth in security services.

References

2001 establishments in Texas
2012 disestablishments in Texas
American companies established in 2001
American companies disestablished in 2012
Companies acquired by Dell
Computer companies established in 2001
Computer companies disestablished in 2012
Computer security companies
Defunct computer companies of the United States